Panic Inc. is an American software and video game company based in Portland, Oregon. The company specializes in macOS and iOS applications and began publishing video games in 2016.

Panic was founded by Steven Frank and Cabel Sasser.

Products

Software 
Panic is known for their flagship app Transmit, Audion, Unison, and Nova (a successor to their web development app Coda). The company has won multiple Apple Design Awards for their products.

In 1999, Audion was introduced as a skinnable MP3 media player. One of its competitors, SoundJam MP, was acquired by Apple in 2000 and was further developed into iTunes 1.0, which became available in 2001. Panic retired Audion in 2004 and began distributing it free of charge.

After Audion, Panic focused development on two other software applications. In 2004, they released Unison, a Usenet reader, and Stattoo, a tool that shows "digital statistics" overlayed on the Mac OS X desktop wallpaper. In 2007, the web development application Coda was introduced. In 2019, Panic announced a successor to Coda named Nova.

Video games 
The company published their first video game, Firewatch, on February 9, 2016. Panic published their second game, Untitled Goose Game, on September 20, 2019.

Playdate 

On May 22, 2019, Panic unveiled Playdate, a handheld gaming device, designed by Panic in collaboration with the Swedish firm Teenage Engineering. The device features a 400x240 pixel 1-bit screen, a directional pad on the left, two buttons on the right, and a mechanical crank on the right edge of the device.

Games will be released in "seasons", at a rate of two games per week for twelve weeks. Games will automatically download to the device when available. While some video games for Playdate are being produced at Panic, most games are created by indie game developers such as Keita Takahashi, Zach Gage, Bennett Foddy, and Shaun Inman.

Awards

References 

American companies established in 1997
Macintosh software companies
Companies based in Portland, Oregon
Software companies based in Oregon
Privately held companies based in Oregon
Video game companies of the United States
Video game companies established in 1997
Software companies established in 1997
Video game publishers
1997 establishments in Oregon
Software companies of the United States
Apple Design Awards recipients